Enrico Dandolo (26 June 1827 in Varese – night of 3 June 1849, during the riots around Villa Corsini, Rome) was an important figure in the Italian Risorgimento, participating in several of its most important battles.

Life
Originating from Dandolo family which produced several other figures involved in the Italian Wars of Independence, Enrico Dandolo was one of the protagonists in the Five Days of Milan (1848) beside his brother Emilio and his friends Luciano Manara and Emilio Morosini.

Gaining experience and maturity in the tactics of guerrilla warfare, he took part (with the Lombard volunteers) in the Legione Manara in the Brescian and Trentine campaigns of the First Italian War of Independence, and participated in the formation of the Roman Republic, in 1849.  During the battle against the French, which finally freed Rome from the insurgents, Dandolo fought at the rank of captain in the Battaglione Bersaglieri Lombardi, under the command of Luciano Manara.

1827 births
1849 deaths
Enrico, Patriot
Italian people of the Italian unification
People from Varese
Italian military personnel killed in action